Hong Ying Animation Co., Ltd. is an Chinese animation studio founded in 1986. The studio that worked on several American and foreign cartoons.

Works 
Hong Ying animated, inked, and/or painted for the following shows:
 The Adventures of Sam (Layouts only)
 Adventures of Sonic the Hedgehog
 Animal Stories
 Archie's Weird Mysteries
 Alienators: Evolution Continues
 Basquash!
 Batman: The Animated Series (Layouts only)
 The Butterfly Lovers: Leon and Jo
 Care Bears: Adventures in Care-a-lot
 Le Chevalier D'Eon (made in France)
 Chowder
 Christmas in Cartoonland
 Clifford the Big Red Dog
 DC Nation ("Deadman" segments)
 Dennis and Gnasher (1996) (made in the UK)
 Downtown
 Double Dragon
 DinoSquad
 Extreme Dinosaurs
 Gadget Boy & Heather
 Gadget and the Gadgetinis
 Gargoyles
 Golgo 13 TV Series
 Gordon the Garden Gnome
 Gowap
 The Haunted Pumpkin of Sleep Hollow
 Hero: 108
 Hey Arnold!
 Horrid Henry
 Horseland
 iZ and the Zizzles
 James Bond Jr.
 Kenny the Shark (overseas animation)
 Kung Fu Dino Posse (Was hired, but not in post-production)
 Liberty's Kids
 Llama Llama
 The New Adventures of Madeline
 Madeline: Lost in Paris
 Mary-Kate and Ashley in Action!
 Mighty Max
 Mortal Kombat: Defenders of the Realm
 Moville Mysteries (Nelvana: Canada)
 Nickelodeon's DIC Movie Toons Oscar's Orchestra Pelswick (Nelvana: Canada)
 Phineas and Ferb Pocket Dragon Adventures Pond Life Princess Gwenevere and the Jewel Riders Robotomy Sabrina: The Animated Series (complete series)
 Sabrina's Secret Life Secret Mountain Fort Awesome Seven Little Monsters (Nelvana: Canada)
 Sherlock Holmes in the 22nd Century Sonic Underground (complete series)
 Stargate Infinity Strawberry Shortcake (2003/2007) Street Sharks Stunt Dawgs Super Dave Sushi Pack The Likeaballs The Magic Key The Wacky World of Tex Avery Taichi Kid Trollz What About Mimi? (Studio B: Canada)
 X-Men (Graduation Day)
 Yamucha's – Kung Fu Academy YoYoMan Yvon of the Yukon (Studio B: Canada)

As a subcontractor for Wang Film Productions:
 The Adventures of Raggedy Ann and Andy Bettlejuice The Care Bears Family Clifford's Fun with Letters The Comic Strip ("Street Frogs" and "Karate Kat" segments)
 The Completely Mental Misadventures of Ed Grimley Dink, the Little Dinosaur Eek! The Cat/The Terrible Thunderlizards Garbage Pail Kids Police Academy: The Animated Series Popeye and Son A Pup Named Scooby-Doo The Real Ghostbusters (Slimer! segments)
 Rockin' with Judy Jetson Scooby-Doo and the Ghoul School The Smurfs Wildfire The World of David the Gnome''

References

External links 
 Official website

Taiwanese animation studios
Chinese animation studios
Mass media companies established in 1986
1992 establishments in China
Companies based in Taipei
Companies based in Suzhou
1986 establishments in Taiwan